"Me and the Farmer" is a single by British Indie rock band The Housemartins from the album The People Who Grinned Themselves to Death. It reached #15 in the UK singles chart the week of 12 September 1987. The song had been written some 18 months previously, on 22 January 1986 (the same day as Happy Hour).

It featured Sandy Blair on the tuba and John Green on the Badminton Racket.

The B-Side "Step Outside" later appeared in the 1988 compilation Now That's What I Call Quite Good.

7 inch single track listing
"Me and the Farmer"
"I Bit My Lip"

12 inch/cassette single track listing
"Me and the Farmer"
"He Will Find You Out"
"Step Outside"
"I Bit My Lip"

Charts

References

1987 singles
The Housemartins songs
1987 songs
Go! Discs singles
Songs written by Paul Heaton
Songs written by Stan Cullimore